Fatmev is a village in Sughd Region, northern Tajikistan. It is part of the jamoat Rarz in the Ayni District. It is located along the river Zeravshan.

References

Populated places in Sughd Region